Senduary is a Gram panchayat in hajipur,  vaishali district, bihar.

Geography
This panchayat is located at

panchayat office
panchayat bhawan Berai (पंचायत भवन Berai )

Nearest City/Town
Hajipur (Distance 10 km)

Nearest major road highway or river
SH 49 ( state highway 49)

compass

Villages in panchayat
There are  villages in this panchayat

References

Gram panchayats in Bihar
Villages in Vaishali district
Vaishali district
Hajipur